The 1939 Indiana Hoosiers football team represented the Indiana Hoosiers in the 1939 Big Ten Conference football season. The participated as members of the Big Ten Conference. The Hoosiers played their home games at Memorial Stadium in Bloomington, Indiana. The team was coached by Bo McMillin, in his sixth year as head coach of the Hoosiers.

Schedule

References

Indiana
Indiana Hoosiers football seasons
Indiana Hoosiers football